Joseph Alan Ormrod (born 22 December 1942) is a former English first-class cricketer who played for Worcestershire and Lancashire.

A right-handed opening batsman, Ormrod was a key member in Worcestershire's back to back Championship winning sides of 1964 and 1965. He passed 1,000 runs in a season on 12 occasions with a best of 1,535 runs in 1978. He toured Pakistan with MCC Under-25 in 1966-67.

Ormrod scored a total of 21,753 runs for Worcestershire and is their only batsman to have scored a century in both innings of a match against Somerset, which he did in 1980. He finished his career with a brief stint at Lancashire.

Ormrod's early cricketing exploits were in Scotland as a reliable and stylish opening batsman for the Kirkcaldy High School 1st XI (average 35.1 in the 1959 season).

References

External links
 

1942 births
Living people
English cricketers
Lancashire cricketers
Worcestershire cricketers
International Cavaliers cricketers
People from Ramsbottom
Marylebone Cricket Club Under-25s cricketers
Marylebone Cricket Club President's XI cricketers